There are 75 Ramsar sites in India. These are wetlands deemed to be of "international importance" under the Ramsar Convention. For a full list of all Ramsar sites worldwide, see the List of Ramsar wetlands of international importance.

According to WWF-India, wetlands are one of the most threatened of all ecosystems in India. Loss of vegetation, salinization, excessive inundation, water pollution, invasive species, excessive development and road building, have all damaged the country's wetlands. In 2022, Twenty Six new sites were added that includes Karikili Bird Sanctuary, Pallikaranai Marsh Reserve Forest & Pichavaram Mangrove from Tamil Nadu, Pala wetland from Mizoram, Sakhya Sagar from Madhya Pradesh. The surface-area covered by Ramsar Sites are around 1,083,322 hectares.  Tamil Nadu has the highest number of Ramsar Sites in India with 14 Ramsar Sites.

Till 2014 there were 26 Ramsar sites across India. Since 2014 till date 49 new Ramsar sites have been added across India.

Number of sites by state 
(as of August 2022)

List of sites
(as of August 2022)

References

External links
 Ramsar Convention - Ramsar Sites in India - भारत के वेटलैंड्स
 The Ramsar Convention on Wetlands, "India plans 10 new Ramsar designations in WWD ceremonies" Press release (February 2, 2000)
 WWF-India, "India highlights new Ramsar sites on World Wetlands Day" (2 February 2006)
 Conservation of wetlands of India – a review{Link} by S.N. Prasad, T.V. Ramachandra, N. Ahalya, T. Sengupta, Alok Kumar, A.K. Tiwari, V.S. Vijayan & Lalitha Vijayan; Salim Ali Centre for Ornithology and Natural History, Coimbatore 641108, Center for Ecological Sciences, Indian Institute Of Science, Bangalore 560012, Regional Remote Sensing Service Centre, Dehradun, Uttaranchal 248001; Tropical Ecology 43(1): 173-186, 2002 ISSN 0564-3295;  © International Society for Tropical Ecology. PDF 
 75 Ramsar Sites in India - GkInsights.com

Ramsar sites
India
Ramsar sites
 Z